Aupa Jino Moeketsi (born 7 April 1994) is a South African footballer who plays for University of Pretoria as a defender.

Club career
Moeketsi joined the SuperSport United academy from Rosina Sedibane Modiba Sport School in 2009.  He was promoted to the first-team squad in January 2013 and made his debut against Platinum Stars on 13 May 2013.

International career
Moeketsi has represented the South African under-20 team at the 2011 COSAFA U-20 Challenge Cup and the 2012 Cape Town International Challenge.

References

1994 births
Living people
People from Emfuleni Local Municipality
Sportspeople from Gauteng
South African Sotho people
South African soccer players
Association football defenders
SuperSport United F.C. players
Vasco da Gama (South Africa) players
Ubuntu Cape Town F.C. players
Pretoria Callies F.C. players
University of Pretoria F.C. players
South African Premier Division players